Huseyngulu Khan was the fifth and last khan of Baku.

Life 
Huseyngulu Khan was born in 1774 to Aligulu agha (brother of Malik Muhammad and Muhammadquli Khan). After the death of the khan in 1792, begs headed by Qasim beg Selimkhanov (according to other sources, his surname was Mansurov) declared him as their new khan.

Early reign 
His reign mostly contested by his cousin, former khan Mirza Muhammad II. Soon after his ascension, he defeated Mirza Muhammad who fled to Quba. He also sent Manaf beg Selimkhanov to Count Gudovich, to present his application for Russian citizenship in 1792. However he was detained in Derbent by Shaykhali Khan's men, who regarded himself as overlord of Baku until 1795.

Shaykhali khan marched on Baku in 1794, however upon hearing the news from Shaki Khanate that Salim khan – new khan of Shaki – massacred all children of former khan, including Shaykhali's nephew, marched on Shaki, leaving Mirza Muhammad II near Balakhana with a thousand men. Being not far from Baku, Mirza Muhammad blocked all trade and support routes to city, causing Huseyngulu to send Manaf beg to Gudovich again complaining of Shaykhali khan while he himself suddenly ambushing Mirza Muhammad and capturing him with his family. His younger brother Husein agha was the only one to escape battle, go to Quba and tell the story. Gudovich on the other hand, advised Shaykhali to settle matters peacefully. Indeed, through Mostafa khan's help, cousins made peace and Mirza Muhammad went back to Quba, while retaining his income from Baku oil fields. According to treaty signed in December 1795:

Capture of Baku 
After Agha Muhammad Shah's invasion of Georgia, Shaykhali khan rushed to submit to Qajar rule. This did not go without retribution from Russia as Catherine II ordered Valerian Zubov to invade Shirvan. Zubov stormed Derbent on 10 May and captured Shaykhali, moving on to Baku. However Huseyngulu sent envoys to Zubov on 20 May, explaining his will to submit. Khan himself arrived at Russian encampment near Gilgilçay on 13 June with city keys. General Vasili Rakhmanov was sent to occupy Baku with 3 battalions of infantry, 2 cavalry squadrons and 3 artillery guns. Tsitsianov was named commanding officer of castle in 1797. However, death of Catherine II and Paul's cancellation of expedition, forced Zubov to withdraw to Russia in 1797.

Later reign 
Now being left at mercy of Agha Muhammad, Huseyngulu was captured and imprisoned in Shusha on 11 May. However shah was assassinated next day, Huseyngulu left for Baku. Hearing developments, Mirza Muhammad rushed to seize Baku. Huseyngulu khan's fast arrival ruined his plans. After new treaty, he positioned himself in Mashtaga, acting as a vice-khan. However, he later sent gifts to Fatali shah, fearing another invasion.

Russian consul in Qajar Iran - Skibinevski arrived in Baku on 22 January 1800 and demanded compensation for Russian merchants from whom large sums of money was taken after Russian withdrawal. Khan declined, but pleaded guilty when a Russian ship "Kizlyar" fired a cannon on city on 6 February. He sent envoys to congratulate Alexander I on his ascension on 1 March 1801.

He invaded Mashtaga, this time with Mostafa khan's help in 1803. Exiling Mirza Muhammad II to Quba.

Occupation of Baku 
Baku was again matter of interest to Russians in the course of Russo-Persian War of 1804–13. As a result of Tsitsianov's negotiations in early 1803, an agreement was reached with the ambassador of the Baku khan – Allahverdi beg on conceding Baku to Russia. On 24 April 1803, Tsitsianov asked Vorontsov to dispatch two regiments (from Taman and the Crimea) at his disposal for the garrison in Baku and the occupation of other points lying about. However, in 1804, at the insistence of the Baku and Shemakhan nobility, the agreement with Russia was cancelled by Huseyngulu. Soon tensions rose in Baku, as city folk killed 7 of the Russian consul's soldiers, expelling him out of the city.

In 1805, a Russian squadron entered the Baku bay under the command of General Irinarch Zavalishin and proceeded to siege the city. Khan sent an envoy to Zavalishin to negotiate, however, he responded that he had been sent by the emperor to occupy Baku and demanded the immediate surrender of the city. Khan asked for a time to give an answer. On 15 April, when the deadline passed and the city did not surrender, Zavalishin landed ashore. However, with reinforcements from Shaykhali khan and Nuh beg of Derbent, khan prevailed in defence of the city. Having suffered defeat after several battles, the Russians boarded the ships and retreated to the island of Sari (near Lankaran).

On 27 December 1805, Tsitsianov informed Alexander I that he himself was going with the army to Baku, to help Zavalishin. At the beginning of February 1806, Tsitsianov, marching with a large army, joined forces with General Zavalishin 2 versts from Baku and began negotiations with khan about the surrender of the fortress to the Russians. Russian troops encamped near Nakhirbulag, just next to city walls. On 8 February, khan, accompanied by his retinue, left the fortress to present city keys to Prince Tsitsianov. In a surprise to many, khan's cousin Ibrahim beg suddenly gunned Tsitsianov and killed him.

Huseyngulu went to Ağsu in person to submit Abbas Mirza. Meanwhile, Mirza Muhammad Khan II joined army of Russian general Sergei Bulgakov in July 1806 to guide Russian army to Baku. Together they captured Baku on 6 October 1806, while Huseyngulu fled to Ardabil with his family. Huseyngulu appeared again in 1826, this time with Qajar army to recapture Baku, but failed to do so. He died in Ardabil, 1845 and was buried in Karbala.

Family 
He had 8 wives, 5 sons and 17 daughters.

Wives 

 Zainat khanum
 Fatma sultan (b. 1776, m. 1801, d. 1804) – daughter of Malik Muhammad Khan
 Fatma khanum
 Hajet khanum
 Begistan khanum
 Khushendam khanum
 Zeynisharaf khanum
 Gulistan khanum

Sons 

 Lutfali khan – had issues
 Isgandar khan – had issues
 Nuh khan – had issues
 Salman khan – had issues
 Musa khan (son of Gulistan khanum) – had issues

Daughters 

 Fatma Sultanat bika
 Badr Jahan khanum
 Sahib Sultan bika
 Khurshid khanum
 Ummu Salama khanum
 Saadet begim
 Zainat begim
 Sharif khanum
 Aisha begim khanum
 Chimnaz khanum  – married to Kazim beg Selimkhanov (1814–1874)
 Tila begim khanum
 Rukhsara begim khanum
 A daughter who was married to Mahammad agha Bakikhanov
 A daughter who was married to Abdullah khan Rudbari
 A daughter who was married to Aghamir Karimov
 A daughter who was married to Zulfugar agha (a cousin of Huseyngulu)
 A daughter who was married to Mahammad agha (a cousin of Huseyngulu)

References 

Khans of Baku
1774 births
1845 deaths
19th-century Azerbaijani people